Mihir Swarup Sharma is an Indian economist who is senior fellow at the Observer Research Foundation and an opinion columnist for Bloomberg News. Before that he was the opinion editor for Business Standard and a columnist for the Indian Express.

In 2015, Sharma wrote a book called Restart: The Last Chance for the Indian Economy.

Bibliography
Sharma, Mihir (2015).  Random House.

References

External links
Mihir Sharma at Penguin India

Indian editors
Living people
Date of birth missing (living people)
Indian political scientists
20th-century Indian economists
Year of birth missing (living people)